Iridomyrmex rufoinclinus is a species of ant in the genus Iridomyrmex. Described by Shattuck in 1993, the species is a common ant in the northern regions of Australia in woodland like habitats, and nests can be found on loose soils.

References

External links

Iridomyrmex
Hymenoptera of Australia
Insects described in 1993